Jean Leray (7 November 1906 – 10 November 1998) was a French mathematician, who worked on both partial differential equations and algebraic topology.

Life and career
He was born in Chantenay-sur-Loire (today part of Nantes). He studied at École Normale Supérieure from 1926 to 1929.  He received his Ph.D. in 1933. In 1934 Leray published an important paper that founded the study of weak solutions of the Navier–Stokes equations. In the same year, he and Juliusz Schauder discovered a topological invariant, now called the Leray–Schauder degree, which they applied to prove the existence of solutions for partial differential equations lacking uniqueness.

From 1938 to 1939 he was professor at the University of Nancy. He did not join the Bourbaki group, although he was close with its founders.

His main work in topology was carried out while he was in a prisoner of war camp in Edelbach, Austria from 1940 to 1945. He concealed his expertise on differential equations, fearing that its connections with applied mathematics could lead him to be asked to do war work.

Leray's work of this period proved seminal to the development of spectral sequences and sheaves. These were subsequently developed by many others, each separately becoming an important tool in homological algebra.

He returned to work on partial differential equations from about 1950.

He was professor at the University of Paris  from 1945 to 1947, and then at the Collège de France until 1978.

He was awarded the Malaxa Prize (Romania, 1938), the Grand Prix in mathematical sciences (French Academy of Sciences, 1940), the Feltrinelli Prize (Accademia dei Lincei, 1971), the Wolf Prize in Mathematics (Israel, 1979), and the Lomonosov Gold Medal (Moscow, 1988). He was an elected to the American Academy of Arts and Sciences and the American Philosophical Society in 1959 and the United States National Academy of Sciences in 1965.

See also
Leray–Schauder theorem

References

External links
 
 
 "Jean Leray (1906–1998)", by Armand Borel, Gennadi M. Henkin, and Peter D. Lax, Notices of the American Mathematical Society, vol. 47, no. 3, March 2000.
 Jean Leray Short biography

1906 births
1998 deaths
20th-century French mathematicians
Mathematical analysts
Topologists
École Normale Supérieure alumni
Wolf Prize in Mathematics laureates
Members of the French Academy of Sciences
Foreign Members of the Royal Society
Foreign Members of the USSR Academy of Sciences
Foreign Members of the Russian Academy of Sciences
Foreign associates of the National Academy of Sciences
Institute for Advanced Study visiting scholars
PDE theorists
Academic staff of Nancy-Université
French prisoners of war in World War II
Members of the American Philosophical Society